Chungnyeol of Goryeo (3 April 1236 – 30 July 1308) was the 25th ruler of the medieval Korean kingdom of Goryeo from 1274 to 1308. He was the son of Wonjong, his predecessor on the throne. Chungnyeol was king during the Mongol Invasions of Japan, reluctantly aiding in the offensives.

Biography

King Chungnyeol was the first Goryeo ruler to be remembered by the title wang (王), meaning "king". Previous rulers had received temple names with the suffix jo (祖) or jong (宗), meaning "revered ancestor" and a title typically reserved for emperors. After Goryeo became a vassal of the Mongol-led Yuan dynasty, the Yuan emperor Kublai Khan perceived this practice as lowering his own power and ordered that the Goryeo rulers could not receive such names henceforth.

King Chungnyeol, who became the Crown Prince Sim(諶) in 1260, proposed to marry a daughter of Kublai Khan in 1271, which Kublai Khan agreed. Since then, for more than 80 years, Goryeo kings married members of Mongol royalty. Heirs to the throne were given Mongol names and were sent to Dadu where they were raised until they reached adulthood.

Reign

The Khan's son-in-law 
After Wonjong's death in 1274, Wang Geo (Chungnyeol) rose to power as the 25th King of Goryeo. He was the first Goryeo king with the degraded title forced upon by the Mongols according to Goryeo's submission to vassal status after its 28 years of fierce resistance against the Mongol Empire. As King Chungnyeol became the son-in-law of Kublai Khan and Goryeo the vassal of the Yuan Dynasty, political interference by Yuan Dynasty furthered on towards Goryeo court. Despite these conditions, King Chungnyeol endeavored to maintain national independence and strengthen autonomy guaranteed by Kublai. One of his achievements was having territories like Dongnyeong and Tamra Prefectures lost during the war against the Mongols returned through negotiations. Also, he made it clear to the Yuan Dynasty of which Goryeo will be exercising the rights to keep its traditions and customs in accordance to the promises made twenty years ago by Kublai himself to Wonjong after submission. King Chungnyeol visited the Yuan Dynasty again in 1278, to have the Mongols withdraw its darughachis and troops stationed in Goryeo on the pretext of Kublai's promise 20 years ago. Troops or officials from the Yuan Dynasty were no longer stationed in Goryeo in the aftermath. These rights and requests enabled were partially attributed to the fact that Korean kings were the Khans' son-in-law with Mongolian princesses as their queens. The Korean kings during times of Yuan influence also had the authority to attend the Kuriltai of the Mongol Empire as titled rulers of Korea and Shenyang (Korean: 고려심왕, Hanja: 高麗瀋王). Even revered darugachis from the Yuan Dynasty could not act carelessly in front of Goryeo kings having to bow in front of them and receive a drink to pay their respects.

King Chungseon during his reign made attempts to make reforms by reestablishing monitoring institutions such as the Censorate of Household and Land Inspection (Korean: 전민변정도감, Hanja: 田民辨整都監) that focuses on confiscating illegal properties under corrupt nobles whilst at the same time promoting the development of Confucianism studies inside the nation. Confucian shrines known as Munmyo (Korean: 문묘, Hanja: 文廟) that pays homage to Gongzi were built in Korea under his reign. Confucianist educational centers such as the Sunkyungam, the predecessor of Sungkyunkwan, were also founded with scholarship foundations proposed by the renowned confucian scholar An Hyang.

Mongol Invasions of Japan (1274~1281) 
When Kublai Khan decided to execute the plan of invading the Kamakura Shogunate of Japan after having their emissaries deliberately ignored or killed by the Japanese, the role of constructing the enormous fleets (along with sending troops) for transport were befallen upon the Koreans of Goryeo. It was a huge expense, but Chungnyeol nor the Goryeo government could oppose the Khan's 'subsequent request' which was rather enforced albeit their opposition. Goryeo eventually suffered great economically due to preparations for the expedition to Japan, and the livelihoods of the people were devastated by the requisition of war supplies. Horse farms set up to raise war horses for the expedition amounted in Jeju Island during these times. It was King Chungnyeol that selected the famed Kim Bang-gyeong (Korean: 김방경, Hanja: 金方慶), a descendant of both Goryeo and Silla royalty, that stood out in the campaign as one of the few competent generals of the Mongol-led expedition, minimizing Korean losses and inflicted significant damage on the Japanese defenders.

Kadaan's Invasion of Korea (1290~1291) 
In 1290, Kadaan (Korean: 카다안, Hanja: 哈丹), a former Mongolian general and rebel of the Yuan Dynasty stationed in Manchuria, invaded Goryeo after his defeat against the Yuan forces led by Naimandai (Korean: 내만대, Hanja: 乃蠻帶). Despite dire situations regarding Kadaan's rebels advancing further into Goryeo territory and the local troops' inability to fend the invaders due to Yuan's forceful disarmament, Chungryeol was said to spoil himself and his followers with extravagant royal banquets; maintaining an indifferent stance towards the invasion. King Chungnyeol, who neglected the situation and wasted national treasury consistently with an irresponsible demeanor, was even criticized by the Mongolian general Naimandai who came to assist the Korean forces fighting Kadaan's rebels. Korean defenses proved effective later on upon achieving decisive victories at Chi'ak Fortress (Korean: 치악성, Hanja: 雉岳城, Modern-day Wonju) and Yeongi (Korean: 연기, Hanja: 燕岐, Modern-day Sejong City), later strengthened by the assistance of the ten-thousand Yuan troops led by Naimandai. Nonetheless, many Korean locals were killed by the Kadaan-led rebels who were scavenging for food and supplies as a result.

Deprived of Power 
After royal authority was strengthened by utilizing the powers of close aides, Chungnyeong continued to spoil himself by enjoying feasts and falconry. Then, with the returning of Crown Prince (King Chungseon) and Princess Gyeguk from Mongolia in 1297, he expressed his intention to cede the throne to his son Jang (King Chungseon) in 1298 and eventually stepped down. However, political strife stemming from opposition towards Chungseon's reform policy and the royal family's adulterous affairs led to political factions plotting between each other. He was eventually reinstated after eight months. In 1306, King Chungnyeol plotted against his son, the Crown Prince, with aims of preventing his reinstatement by having them divorced since Goryeo kings at the time could only rise to power under the condition of marrying a Mongolian Princess. However, the Crown Prince's quick response to the king's plot along with the abscession of Külüg Khan, the brother of the Prince's wife, neutralized such attempts made by Chungnyeong. The Crown Prince was eventually crowned in 1307 as King Chungseon, with Chungnyeol having been detained at a temple in Dadu. He eventually returned to Goryeo with all political power deprived.

Death 
After a crushing defeat in the political dispute with his own son and returning to Goryeo, King Chungnyeol lost his will to politics and died at the age of 73 in Shinhyo Temple in July 1308, spending his final days hunting and drinking. He was said to have deep regrets regarding how the nation was left devastated and the political dispute causing discord between family members of the Royal House.

Family
Father: Wonjong of Goryeo (고려 원종)
Grandfather: Gojong of Goryeo (고려 고종)
Grandmother: Queen Anhye (안혜왕후)
Mother: Queen Jeongsun (정순왕후)
Grandfather: Gim Yak-seon (김약선)
Grandmother: Lady, of the Ubong Choe clan (부인 우봉 최씨)
Consorts and their Respective issue(s):
Queen Jangmok of the Yuan Borjigin clan (장목왕후 보르지긴씨; 1251–1297)
Crown Prince Wang Won (태자 왕원)
Unnamed daughter (b. 1277)
Unnamed son (b. 1278)
Princess Jeonghwa of the Gaeseong Wang clan (정화궁주 왕씨; d. 1319); third cousin once removed.
Wang Ja, Duke Gangyang (왕자 강양공)
Primary Consort Jeongnyeong (정녕원비)
Primary Consort Myeongsun (명순원비)
Primary Consort Sukchang of the Eonyang Gim clan (숙창원비 김씨) – No issue.
Ban-Ju (시비 반주)
Prince Wang Seo (소군 왕서)
Royal Consort Mu of the Taein Si clan (무비 시씨; d. 1297) – No issue.
Concubine Gim (후궁 김씨) – No issue.

In popular culture
 Portrayed by Jin Won in the 2012 MBC TV series God of War.
 Portrayed by Jeong Bo-seok in the 2017 MBC TV series The King in Love.

See also
Korea under Yuan rule

References

 

1236 births
1308 deaths
13th-century Korean monarchs
14th-century Korean monarchs
Korean Buddhist monarchs